Aloma of the South Seas may refer to:

 Aloma of the South Seas (1926 film), a 1926 silent film
 Aloma of the South Seas (1941 film), a 1941 film nominated for two Academy Awards